ESO 383-76 (ESO 383-G 076) is an elongated, X-ray luminous supergiant elliptical galaxy; the dominant and brightest member of the Abell 3571 galaxy cluster.

Observation history 
The first known observation of the galaxy was during the creation of the Morphological Catalogue of Galaxies by Boris Vorontsov-Velyaminov and V.P. Harkipova in 1974, with the catalogue entry MCG-05-33-002. The  galaxy was also observed around this time by the ESO Sky Survey Atlas, a large-scale survey of the Southern Sky conducted using the 1-metre Schmidt telescope in La Silla Observatory. In 1982, the ESO/Uppsala Catalogue then lists the galaxy in its current designation form – ESO 383-G 076, indicating both its field number (field 383 out of the 606 in the survey), classification (G, for "Galaxy"), and its numerical identifier in its field. The galaxy, at this point, was nothing more than just an obscure catalogue entry.

O.G. Richter in 1984 then observed the galaxy during a redshift survey of the ESO/SRC Survey Fields 444 and 445 of the Klemola 27 group (now known as the IC 4329 galaxy group). The group consists of prominent galaxies such as the namesake IC 4329 – another massive supergiant elliptical that is also an extreme Seyfert galaxy, and NGC 5291 – a disturbed interacting galaxy pair. ESO 383-76, initially thought to be a member of this group, was listed as the 442nd galaxy in Richter's table entry and has been given the morphology E/S0 (either an elliptical or lenticular galaxy). The galaxy has also been included in the Southern Galaxy Catalogue, containing nearly 5,000 galaxies, compiled in 1985 by the husband-and-wife astrophysicists Gérard and Antoinette de Vaucouleurs, along with H.G. Corwin Jr.

ESO 383-76 would be additionally recorded in many subsequent galaxy surveys, such as the survey of the Hydra–Centaurus Supercluster by L.N. da Costa et al in 1986, and moreover a photometric catalogue by Lauberts and Valentijn in 1989 that made the first angular diameter measurements of the galaxy. This includes the D25 and D25.5 B-band isophotes, as well as the 50% total light emission (the half-light radius) and variations of it (60%, 70%, and 90%). A.P. Fairall et al would further incorporate the galaxy in their wide-scale survey of the Hydra-Centaurus Supercluster in 1989. It was additionally included in many other surveys due to its location in the sky in the rich Centaurus region and the wide-scale research of extragalactic objects near the Milky Way plane by the last decade of the 20th century. The galaxy has additionally been catalogued by Alan Dressler in 1991 during an analysis of velocities of 1,314 galaxies near the Milky Way galactic plane region – allowing to pinpoint the location and verify the existence of the Great Attractor.

Description 
ESO 383-76 is a supergiant elliptical galaxy (type-cD galaxy) of an advanced Hubble morphology (E5, with E0 being spherical and E7 being flattened), with its major axis being more than twice the length of its minor axis. The galaxy is a very luminous source of X-rays, and is the sixth-brightest X-ray source in the sky.

In an analysis of the cluster A3571 by H. Quintana and R. de Souza in 1994, ESO 383-76 has been noted to have a very elongated shape with a diffuse halo extending throughout the cluster, suggesting that the galaxy had formed very early during the formation of Abell 3571 and it retains the original imprint of its collapsing cloud.

Size 
There are various methods used in astronomy in defining the size of a galaxy, and each of them can yield different results with respect to the other. This is usually affected by exposure time, the wavelength used, and the instrument being used.

One method that is commonly used in the astronomical literature is the galaxy effective radius where 50% of the total galaxy's light was emitted; variations of 60%, 70%, and 90% are also used. This makes it one of the largest physical diameter measurements of any galaxy known – 20 times that of the Milky Way's diameter, and 3.5 times that of the maximum estimated diameter of IC 1101.

The halo extends throughout a large part of Abell 3571.

Environment 

ESO 383-76 lies at the center of the Abell 3571 galaxy cluster, which is a possible member of the Shapley Supercluster (or alternatively the Shapley 8 Concentration – an outlying structure). This massive supercluster hosts many clusters with similar supergiant elliptical galaxies, among them ESO 444-46.

See also 
 List of largest galaxies
 Galaxy effective radius
 Messier 87
 ESO 306-17
 NeVe 1
 IC 1101

Notes

References 

Galaxies discovered in 1974
Centaurus (constellation)
MCG objects